The 2010 Women's Professional Soccer All-Star Game was the second WPS All-Star Game, taking place on June 30, 2010.  Thirty-six players were divided into two teams with the top US vote-getter (Abby Wambach) and the top international vote-getter (Marta) as captains.  Marta's XI defeated Abby's XI by five to two.

Atlanta Beat named host
WPS awarded the 2010 All-Star Game to Atlanta, Georgia in a press release on March 22, 2010.  The venue was KSU Soccer Stadium, home of the Atlanta Beat.

WPS All-Stars

Voting
Twenty-two of the thirty-six WPS All-Stars were chosen by vote.  25% of the total vote came from fans voting online, 25% from media, 25% from coaches (who were prohibited from voting for their team's players), and 25% from players.  The results of the voting were released on June 9, 2010. 

The top three fan picks this year were Wambach, Marta, and Hope Solo.  Three players - Wambach, Marta, and Kelly Smith - topped out the coach's voting with 100% of coaches voting for them.  Likewise, two players - Sonia Bompastor and Eniola Aluko - got 100% of the media vote.  Along with those six players, Shannon Boxx, Christine Sinclair, Lori Lindsey, and Amy LePeilbet rounded out the top ten.

At-Large Selections
The remaining fourteen players on the All-Star rosters were selected by WPS Commissioner Tonya Antonucci and the two All-Star coaches Albertin Montoya and Paul Riley, who were the coaches of the two teams topping the standings at the time, on June 14.

2010 All-Star Rosters
Bold indicates Starting XI's from pick-'em resultsItalic indicates players who missed the All-Star game due to injury* replacement player

Abby's XI

Marta's XI

Match details

Statistics

See also

External links
Official press release

2010 Women's Professional Soccer season
Soccer in Georgia (U.S. state)
All-star games
2010 in sports in Georgia (U.S. state)